Amauris is a genus of nymphalid butterflies in the Danainae subfamily. Amauris niavius niavius, Amauris echeria jacksoni, and Amauris dominicanus are mimicked by Papilio dardanus females. Other mimics of Amauris are found among other species of Papilio, the nymphaline genus Pseudacraea, and Hypolimnas anthedon.

Species
 Amauris comorana – Comoro friar
 Amauris nossima – Madagascan friar
 Amauris phoedon – Mauritian friar
 Amauris niavius – friar
 Amauris tartarea – monk
 Amauris ellioti – Ansorge's Danaid
 Amauris echeria
 Amauris vashti
 Amauris crawshayi
 Amauris damocles
 Amauris hyalites
 Amauris albimaculata – layman
 Amauris ochlea – novice
 Amauris dannfelti
 Amauris inferna
 Amauris hecate – dusky Danaid

External links

Seitz, A. Die Gross-Schmetterlinge der Erde 13: Die Afrikanischen Tagfalter. Plate 23 et seq.
"Amauris Hübner, 1816" at Markku Savela's Lepidoptera and Some Other Life Forms

 
Danaini
Nymphalidae genera
Taxa named by Jacob Hübner
Taxonomy articles created by Polbot